Daegu station is a station on the Gyeongbu Line and Daegu Metro Line 1 in Chilseong-dong, Buk District, Daegu, South Korea.

External links 
  Daegu Station – Korail
 DTRO virtual station
 Cyber station information from Daegu Metropolitan Transit Corporation

See also 
 Autumn Uprising of 1946
 Lotte Department Store

Railway stations in Daegu
Railway stations in Korea opened in 1905
Buk District, Daegu
Daegu Metro stations